Peter Strömberg (born 23 April 1956) is a retired Swedish footballer. Strömberg made 22 Allsvenskan appearances for Djurgården and scored 2 goals.

References

1956 births
Living people
Swedish footballers
Djurgårdens IF Fotboll players
Östers IF players
Allsvenskan players
Association football midfielders